Wila Salla (Aymara wila red, salla rocks, cliffs, "red rocks") is a  mountain in the Andes of Bolivia. It is located in the Oruro Department, Eduardo Abaroa Province, Challapata Municipality, and in the Potosí Department, Tomás Frías Province, Tinguipaya Municipality. It lies southeast of Kuntur Nasa.

References 

Mountains of Oruro Department